The Prince of Rogues is a 1928 German silent drama film directed by Curtis Bernhardt and starring Hans Stüwe, Lissy Arna and Albert Steinrück. It was shot at the Johannisthal Studios in Berlin. The film's art direction was by Heinrich Richter. The story depicts the life of the 18th century outlaw Schinderhannes. It is based on a 1927 play Schinderhannes by Carl Zuckmayer.

Cast
Hans Stüwe as Hannes Bückler - Schinderhannes
Lissy Arna as Julchen Blasius
Albert Steinrück as Leyendecker
Bruno Ziener as the old Bückler
Frida Richard as Seine Frau
Ivan Koval-Samborsky as Karl Benzel
Fritz Richard as the old Blasius
Fritz Rasp as Heinrich Benzel
Oskar Homolka as Amtmann
 as robber
Nico Turoff as robber
Albert Florath
Tonio Gennaro as robber
 as robber

Carl Busse
Ernst Rotmund

See also
Der Schinderhannes (1958)

References

External links

1920s adventure drama films
1920s historical drama films
German adventure drama films
German historical drama films
Films of the Weimar Republic
German silent feature films
Films directed by Curtis Bernhardt
German films based on plays
Films based on works by Carl Zuckmayer
Biographical films about bandits
Films set in the 18th century
Hunsrück
Films shot at Johannisthal Studios
German black-and-white films
1928 drama films
Silent adventure drama films
1920s German films